Joachim Napoléon Murat, 7th Prince Murat (16 January 1920 – 20 July 1944) was a French soldier and Head of the Bonaparte-Murat noble family, descended from Joachim Murat, 1st Prince Murat and Caroline Bonaparte, sister of Napoleon. He was killed fighting for the French resistance during World War II.

Biography
Murat was a member of the French resistance during the Second World War. He was killed by a patrol of the Das Reich Division on 20 July 1944, aged only twenty-four.
Maxime Weygand said of him: "A young officer distinguished by his zealousness and courage, a true leader of men."

Before his death, Murat was married on 18 August 1940, in Marseille to Nicole Véra Claire Hélène Pastré (1921-1992), the daughter of Countess Lily Pastré, a philanthropist who founded the Aix-en-Provence Festival in 1948, and Count Jean Pastré, a polo player who played polo at the 1924 Summer Olympics.

They had three children:
 Princess "Caroline" Marie Louise Murat (b. 1941) : Married in 1962 to Count Yves de Parcevaux,(b. 1936) and divorced. Married in 1967 to Miklós Klobusiczky de Klobusicz et Zétény (b. 1946).
 Children:
 Count Amaury de Parcevaux (b. 1963).
 Patricia Klobusiczky  de Klobusicz et Zétény (b. 1968).
 Arielle Klobusiczky  de Klobusicz et Zétény (b. 1971).
 Princess Madeleine Marie Annonciade "Malcy" Murat (1943-1990).
 "Joachim" Louis Napoleon Murat, 8th Prince Murat (b. 1944), current head of the House of Bonaparte-Murat: Married Laurence Mouton and had issue.

Awards

Medals:
Croix de Guerre avec Palme (War Cross with Palm). Légion d'Honneur (posthumous).

Ancestry

References

External links
https://web.archive.org/web/20100613020836/http://chivalricorders.org/royalty/gotha/muratgen.htm
https://web.archive.org/web/20080324094546/http://bernard.frantz1.free.fr/KStableau/KS_DESC_BONAPARTE/ksfam.htm

of the First French Empire

|-

1920 births
1944 deaths
People from Neuilly-sur-Seine
House of Bonaparte
Murat
French people of American descent
French Resistance members
Princes Murat
French military personnel killed in World War II
Free French military personnel of World War II